The World Bridge Federation (WBF) is the international governing body for contract bridge. 

Emulating the organizational concepts of the Olympic movement and its signature five rings, the World Bridge Federation encompasses the five continents (America, Europe, Africa, Asia and Oceania) represented by eight geographic Zonal Conferences. Each Zonal Conference consists of member countries as represented by their respective National Bridge Organization.

International and multi-national 

Note:  member numbers as of 2021 (source: WBF website)

National

Europe

North America

South America

Asia and Middle East

Central America and the Caribbean

Asia Pacific

South Pacific

Africa

Notes

References

External links
World Bridge Federation - Zonal Organisations and National Bridge Organisations